The moth family Drepanidae contains the following genera:

A
Achlya
Aethiopsestis
Agnidra - includes Zanclalbara
Albara
Amphitorna - includes Neoreta, Procampsis, Tomocerota
Archidrepana
Argodrepana
Asphalia
Astatochroa
Auzata - includes Gonocilix
Auzatella
Auzatellodes

B
Baipsestis
Betapsestis
Bycombia

C
Callicilix
Callidrepana - includes Ausaris, Damna, Drepanulides, Drepanulina, Ticilia
Camptopsestis
Canucha - includes Campylopteryx
Ceranemota
Chaeopsestis
Cilix
Crocinis
Crucidava
Cyclidia
Cyclogaurena
Cymatophorima
Cymotrix

D
Darumona
Demopsestis
Deroca
Didymana
Dipriodonta
Ditrigona - includes Leucodrepana, Leucodrepanilla
Drapetodes
Drepana

E
Epicampoptera
Epipsestis
Eudeilinia
Euparyphasma
Euphalacra - includes Ectothyris, Neophalacra
Euthyatira - includes Persiscota

F
Falcaria - includes Edapteryx
Formotogaria

G
Gaurena
Gogana - includes Ametroptila, Liocrops, Trotothyris
Gonoreta
Gonoretodes
Griseogaurena

H
Habrona
Habrosyne - includes Cymatochrocis, Habrosynula, Hannya, Miothyatira
Haloplia
Haplothyatira
Hemictenarcha
Hemiphruda
Horipsestis
Horithyatira
Hyalospectra
Hyalostola
Hypsidia - includes Baryphanes, Eggersops

I
Isopsestis
Isospidia

K
Kosemponiola
Kurama

L
Leucoblepsis
Lomadontophana

M
Macrauzata
Macrocilix
Macrothyatira
Marplena
Melanocraspes
Mesopsestis
Mesothyatira
Metadrepana
Microblepsis - includes Betalbara
Microthytira
Mimopsestis
Mimozethes
Monoprista
Monothyatira

N
Negera
Nelcynda
Nemacerota
Neochropacha
Neodaruma
Neoploca
Neopsestis
Neotogaria
Nephoploca
Nidara
Nordstromia - includes Allodrepana
Nothoploca

O
Ochropacha
Oreta - includes Dryopteris, Holoreta, Hypsomadius, Mimoreta, Oretella, Psiloreta, Rhamphoreta
Oretopsis

P
Paragnorima
Paralbara
Parapsestis
Peridrepana
Phalacra
Phalacrothyris
Pithania
Plusinia
Polydactylos
Polyploca - includes Parmelina
Problepsidis
Pseudalbara
Pseudemodesa
Pseuderosia
Pseudothyatira
Psidopala
Psidopaloides

S
Sabra
Scytalopteryx
Sewa
Shinploca
Spectroreta
Spica
Spidia
Stenopsestis
Strepsigonia - includes Monurodes
Streptoperas
Sugiploca
Sugitaniella
Suzupsestis

T
Takapsestis - includes Neogaurena
Teldenia
Tethea - includes Episaronaga, Palimpsestis, Saronaga
Tetheella
Thaleridia
Thyatira
Thymistadopsis
Thymistida - includes Hybodrepana, Thymistada
Togaria
Toxoides
Tridrepana - includes Konjikia

U
Uranometra
Urogonodes

W
Watsonalla
Wernya

Y
Yucilix

Z
Zusidava - includes Emodesa

References 

 Note that this still contains several genera as valid which are now junior synonyms.
  Genus and species lists probably incomplete.

Drepanid